Xeo-Genetic is the fourth studio album by the electro group Aux 88. The album was nominated for the Detroit Music Awards.

Track listing
 Begin (Intro 1) 0:11 
 Welcome (Intro 2) 1:02 
 Play It Loud 5:17 
 The Light (Interlude) 0:48 
 Electric Light 5:25 
 Synthesizers 5:35 
 No Time (Episode) 2:35 
 I Hear Rhythms 6:05 
 Radio Waves 5:26 
 Don't Stop It 4:51 
 Xeo-Genetic 2:59 
 Just A Test (Interlude) 0:04 
 I Need To Find Myself 3:12 
 Rise Of The Phoenix 6:02 
 Alien Contact (Interlude) 0:48 
 Computer Speaks 4:56 
 Hydro Spin (Episode) 1:12 
 Rhythm By Numbers 4:37 
 Completed (Outro 1) 0:32 
 Return (Outro 2) 0:07

References

1999 albums
Aux 88 albums